A bumblebee is a flying insect of the genus Bombus.

Bumblebee or bumble bee may also refer to:

Biology
 Bumblebee orchid (Ophrys bombyliflora)
 Bumblebee shrimp (Caridina trifasciata)
 Striped bumblebee shrimp (Gnathophyllum americanum)
 Bumblebee bat or Kitti's hog-nosed bat
 Bumblebee hummingbird
 Bumblebee poison frog or yellow-banded poison dart frog
 Bumble bee scarab beetle

Fish
 Bumblebee catfish, several species
 Bumblebee cichlid, Pseudotropheus crabro
 Bumblebee goby, species of the genus Brachygobius
 Bumblebee grouper or giant grouper

Music
 Bumblebee Records, which released the first solo album by Kenji Ueda
 "Bumble bee", a Frankenstrat guitar
 Hummel (instrument) ("bumble bee") an old Swedish stringed instrument which produces a droning sound

Songs
 "Flight of the Bumblebee", an orchestral interlude written by Nikolai Rimsky-Korsakov for his opera The Tale of Tsar Saltan, composed in 1899–1900
 "Bumble Bee", a song originally recorded by Memphis Minnie in 1929
 "Bumble Bee" (LaVern Baker song), a 1960 song made popular by The Searchers in 1965 (UK #1 EP)
 "Bumblebee", a song by Ween on the 1990 album GodWeenSatan: The Oneness
 "Bumble Bee", a 1999 song by Desirée Sparre-Enger (Bambee)
 "Bumble Bees", a 2000 song by Aqua
 "BumbleBeee", a 2014 song by Kasabian
 "Bumblebees", a 2015 song by Bloodhound Gang
 "Bumble Bee" (Zedd and Botnek song), a 2015 song by DJ Zedda
 "Bumblebee", a song by Smokepurpp and Murda Beatz from the 2018 mixtape Bless Yo Trap
 "Bumblebee" (Lead song), 2018 single by Japanese hip-hop group Lead
 "Bumblebee", a song by ABBA on the 2021 album  Voyage

Transportation
 ADI Bumble Bee, an American gyrocopter
 Bumble-Bee (livery) an informal name for the black and yellow New Zealand railway locomotive livery
 Bumble Bee II, the world's smallest piloted airplane
 Freewind Bumble B, a French gyrocopter
 Bumblebee Edition, an edition of the Saturn S-Series
 Bumblebee Limited Edition, an edition of the Porsche 914
 Humlebien ("Bumblebee"), the nickname for the Type C Nimbus motorcycle
 Nelson Bumblebee, a glider produced by Nelson Aircraft

Military
 Hummel (vehicle) ("Bumble Bee"), a self-propelled artillery gun used by the German Wehrmacht during World War II
 Bumbar ("Bumble Bee"), a short-range portable anti-tank missile system developed and produced by Serbia
 RPO-A Shmel (Bumblebee), a man-portable rocket launcher produced and exported by Russia and the former Soviet Union
 Beriev A-50 ("bumble bee" in Russian), an AWACS aircraft

Operations
 Operation Bumblebee, a top secret US Navy program designed to develop rockets and ramjets at the end of World War II
 Operation Teardrop, originally code-named "Operation Bumblebee", a US Navy operation of World War II
 Operation Bumblebee, in the Korean War in by the 3rd Battalion 7th Marines

People
 Bumble Bee Slim (1905–1968), American blues singer
 Bumblebee, the professional nickname of a Russian breakdancer Sergei Chernyshev

Places
 Bumble Bee, Arizona, a US ghost town
 Bumblebee, California, near Bumblebee Creek, US

Fiction
 Bumblebee (Transformers), a car robot superhero in the American Transformers robot superhero franchise.
 Bumblebee (film), a 2018 film based on the Transformers character
 Bumblebee (DC Comics), a DC Comics superheroine
 Bumblebee Man, a character from The Simpsons

Other uses
 Bumble Bee Foods, a commercial brand of canned fish and other food products
 Bumblebee models, in mathematical physics, field theories with spontaneous Lorentz violation
 Drozd BB rifle or "bumblebee", marked as such for its color scheme and sound
 Operation Bumblebee (UK), an anti-burglary campaign undertaken by London's Metropolitan Police
 Bumble Bee, a brightly coloured children's ride at Marineland
 "Bumble Bee 1", the nickname for the first C2-class Melbourne tram
 BumbleBee, a plastic ball-bearing transaxle yo-yo produced by Duncan Toys Company
 Bumblebee Project, an Nvidia Optimus implementation for Linux

See also
 
 Bhrngadutam ("The bumblebee messenger"), a Sanskrit minor poem
 Bumble (disambiguation)
 Bumblebeewolf, a species of bee-hunting wasp
 Buhmble Bee, a member of Nemesis (rap crew)
 Dumbledor (disambiguation) (an obsolete word for bumblebee)
 Gita milindam ("Song of the Bumblebee") in Sanskrit, first published in 1999